Örjan Sandler (born 28 September 1940) is a former Swedish speed skater who competed in five Winter Olympics between 1964 and 1980.

Olympic results

In 1964 he finished 17th in the 10000 m, 18th in the 1500 me, and 19th in the 5000 m contest. Four years later he won the bronze medal in the 10000 m event. He finished sixth in the 5000 m and tenth in the 1500 m contest.

At the 1972 Games he finished 14th in the 5000 m and 15th in the 10000 m competition. In 1976 he finished fifth in the 10000 m and eighth in the 5000 m event.

His final Olympic appearance was in 1980 when he finished 14th in the 10000 m competition.

Other activities
Sandler was an active and versatile athlete who competed in long-distance running, cycling, orienteering, triathlon, cross-country and Nordic skiing. He was particularly successful in triathlon, winning multiple international competitions in various age groups such as the World Championships in 2001.

References

External links
Ironman results

1940 births
Living people
Swedish male speed skaters
Olympic speed skaters of Sweden
Speed skaters at the 1964 Winter Olympics
Speed skaters at the 1968 Winter Olympics
Speed skaters at the 1972 Winter Olympics
Speed skaters at the 1976 Winter Olympics
Speed skaters at the 1980 Winter Olympics
Olympic bronze medalists for Sweden
Olympic medalists in speed skating

Medalists at the 1968 Winter Olympics
20th-century Swedish people